is a 1957 Japanese drama film directed by Tadashi Imai. It was entered into the 10th Cannes Film Festival.

Plot
Two young men, Tsuguo and Senkichi, return to their small home town during the rice planting festival, and try to make a living as fishermen.

Cast
 Shinjirō Ehara as Tsuguo Tamura
 Eijirō Tōno as Sakuzō
 Yūko Mochizuki as Yone Yasuda
 Masako Nakamura as Chiyo Yasuda
 Izumi Hara as Ume Tamura
 Yoshi Katō as Takezō Yasuda
 Isao Kimura as Senkichi
 Hitomi Nakahara as Yoshino Tamura
 Toshiko Okada
 Junkichi Orimoto as Fisherman
 Isao Yamagata as Matsunosuke Ōta

Awards
1957 Blue Ribbon Awards for Best Film, Best Director and Best Actress Yūko Mochizuki.

References

External links

1957 films
1957 drama films
Japanese drama films
Films directed by Imai Tadashi
Best Film Kinema Junpo Award winners
1950s Japanese films